Walter Evans (footballer) may refer to:
Walter Evans (footballer, born 1867) (1867–1897), Aston Villa F.C. and Wales international footballer
Walter Evans (Bilbao footballer) (fl. 1901–1904), English footballer who played as a striker for Athletic Club

See also
Walter Evans (disambiguation)